Cards for Hospitalized Kids is an American national charitable organization based in Chicago that was founded in March 2011 by Jen Rubino. The mission of Cards for Hospitalized Kids is to provide hospitalized children with hope, joy and magic through handmade cards. Over 500,000 kids have received cards from Cards for Hospitalized Kids since inception. 

Individuals and groups across the United States, and abroad, get involved with Cards for Hospitalized Kids by making handmade cards and sending them to Cards for Hospitalized Kids for distribution in hospitals. Cards for Hospitalized Kids has received support from multiple celebrities such as Lauren Conrad, Nastia Liukin, and Aly Raisman who send in cards and autographed pictures for Cards for Hospitalized Kids to distribute in hospitals. Individuals and organizations also become involved with Cards for Hospitalized Kids by hosting their own card-making events where they make cards for Cards for Hospitalized Kids to distribute in hospitals. IndyCar racer Graham Rahal, who is involved with Cards for Hospitalized Kids, and his foundation hosted their own card-making event for Cards for Hospitalized Kids in May 2012. Dolphin trainers at Sea World San Diego also hosted their own card-making event for Cards for Hospitalized Kids in December 2011. As a result of this national support, thousands of children at more than 150 hospitals and Ronald McDonald Houses nationwide have received cards from them. Cards are delivered to hospitals monthly. In 2013, Cards for Hospitalized Kids began to receive international support with cards arriving from other countries such as Japan, Australia, and Israel.

Cards for Hospitalized Kids has utilized social media tremendously.  They continue to spread the word through their Facebook and Twitter accounts, which has helped them gain support from people around the world. Tweets from MTV Star Lauren Conrad resulted in nearly 500 additional Twitter followers for them. Another way Cards for Hospitalized Kids has spread the word is through the media. Cards for Hospitalized Kids has been featured in many publications such as International Gymnast Magazine, the Sun Times, the TribLocal, Teen Voices Magazine and MTV Act among others. Founder Jen Rubino has also blogged about Cards for Hospitalized Kids and her own experience in the hospital for the Huffington Post.  They also maintain a website.

Cards for Hospitalized Kids and its founder, Jen Rubino, have received multiple honors and awards for their service. In November 2012, Founder Jen Rubino received the Daily Point of Light Award for her work doing Cards for Hospitalized Kids. The award was created by President George H. W. Bush to "honor individuals and groups creating meaningful change in communities across America". To this day, President Bush continues to sign all of the awards. In June 2013, Founder Jen Rubino was awarded the Prudential Spirit of Community Award from Prudential Financial for her work doing Cards for Hospitalized Kids. The Illinois House of Representatives also recognized Cards for Hospitalized Kids and Founder Jen Rubino in a resolution in which they detailed some of the accomplishments of Cards for Hospitalized Kids and expressed congratulations to Rubino on receiving the Prudential Spirit of Community award.

References

External links

Children's charities based in the United States